John Haute (died ca. 1410), of Canterbury, Kent, was an English politician and draper.

Family
Haute was married twice; both women were named Alice.

Career
Haute was a Member of Parliament for Canterbury, Kent in October 1404.

References

Year of birth missing
1410 deaths
14th-century births
English MPs October 1404
People from Canterbury